The Funk House, located at 523 North Cary Avenue in Jennings, Louisiana, is a historic house with elements of Queen Anne and Eastlake architectural styles.

Built in about 1895, it is notable for reflecting the Midwest origins of the people of the town, in its relative verticality and minimal porches, and for "some of the very finest Eastlake ornamentation to survive in Jennings" in its porches and front window.  The porches and front window "feature richly three dimensional ornamentation, including scroll and curved brackets, ball drops, cut out designs, and scallops. Although small elements, these make quite an architectural statement."

The house was listed on the National Register of Historic Places on April 1, 1993.

See also
 National Register of Historic Places listings in Jefferson Davis Parish, Louisiana

References

Houses on the National Register of Historic Places in Louisiana
Queen Anne architecture in Louisiana
Houses completed in 1895
Jefferson Davis Parish, Louisiana